José María de la Vega Lárraga (born 7 August 1939) is a Mexican politician affiliated with the National Action Party. As of 2014 he served as Deputy of the LIX Legislature of the Mexican Congress representing San Luis Potosí.

References

1939 births
Living people
National Action Party (Mexico) politicians
Deputies of the LIX Legislature of Mexico
Members of the Chamber of Deputies (Mexico) for San Luis Potosí